Charles Wix Garner (January 29, 1897 – February 5, 1978) was an American sports coach and college athletics administrator.  He served as the head football coach at Western Illinois University in Macomb, Illinois for five seasons, from 1942 to 1943 and 1945 to 1947, compiling a record of 13–21–4.

Head coaching record

Football

References

1897 births
1978 deaths
American football quarterbacks
American men's basketball players
Baseball outfielders
Basketball coaches from Illinois
Northern Illinois Huskies baseball players
Northern Illinois Huskies football players
Northern Illinois Huskies men's basketball players
Western Illinois Leathernecks athletic directors
Western Illinois Leathernecks baseball coaches
Western Illinois Leathernecks football coaches
Western Illinois Leathernecks men's basketball coaches
People from DeKalb, Illinois
Sportspeople from the Chicago metropolitan area